Zinedine Labyad (born 7 March 2000) is a French professional footballer who plays as a forward for Grenoble.

Club career
Labyad began his career with the reserves of Troyes and Celta Vigo B, and followed that with a stint with Prix-lès-Mézières. He moved to Grenoble in the summer of 2021. He made his professional debut with Grenobole in a 4–0 Ligue 2 loss to Paris FC on 24 July 2021.

Personal life
Born in France, Labyad is of Moroccan descent.

References

External links
 
 

2000 births
Living people
People from Charleville-Mézières
French footballers
French sportspeople of Moroccan descent
Association football forwards
Grenoble Foot 38 players
Celta de Vigo B players
ES Troyes AC players
Ligue 2 players
Championnat National 3 players
French expatriate footballers
French expatriate sportspeople in Spain
Expatriate footballers in Spain
Sportspeople from Ardennes (department)
Footballers from Grand Est